Naunton Wayne (born Henry Wayne Davies, 22 June 1901 – 17 November 1970), was a Welsh character actor, born in Pontypridd, Glamorgan, Wales.  He was educated at Clifton College. His name was changed by deed poll in 1933.

Stage actor
His first London stage roles were in Streamline at the Palace in 1934 and in 1066 and All That at the Strand in 1935 (where he provided comic continuity for other performers). His first full role was as Norman Weldon in Wise Tomorrow at The Lyric in 1937. He played Mortimer Brewster in Arsenic and Old Lace at the Strand for four years. He was a leading member of The Stage Golfing Society.

From November 1956 he appeared in the long-running farce The Bride and the Bachelor at the Duchess Theatre.

Film actor
He became best known for his role as a supporting character, Caldicott, in the 1938 film version of The Lady Vanishes, a role he repeated in three further films, alongside Basil Radford as his equally cricket-obsessed friend, Charters. The two would go on to appear in other films together, often playing similar characters. Their other joint credits include Night Train to Munich (1940), Crook's Tour (1941), Millions Like Us (1943), Dead of Night (1945), Quartet (1948), It's Not Cricket (1949), and Passport to Pimlico (1949).

Wayne also appeared alone in other films including the Ealing comedy The Titfield Thunderbolt (1953) and Obsession (1949).

Personal life
Wayne married Gladys Dove, a concert pianist, in 1927 and they had two sons, Peter and John.

Death
Wayne died in Tolworth, in the county of Surrey on 17 November 1970, at the age of 69.

Filmography

 The First Mrs. Fraser (1932) – Compere
 Going Gay (1933) – Jim
 For Love of You (1933) – Jim
 Something Always Happens (1934) – Man Refusing to Help Peter (uncredited)
 The Lady Vanishes (1938) – Caldicott
 A Girl Must Live (1939) – Hugo Smythe
 Night Train to Munich (1940) – Caldicott
 Crook's Tour (1941) – Caldicott
 The Next of Kin (1942) – Careless talker on train (last scene)
 Millions Like Us (1943) – Caldicott
 Dead of Night (1945) – Larry Potter
 A Girl in a Million (1946) – Fotheringham
 Quartet (1948) – Leslie (segment "The Facts of Life")
 It's Not Cricket (1949) – Capt. Early
 Passport to Pimlico (1949) – Straker
 Stop Press Girl (1949) – The Mechanical Type
 Helter Skelter (1949) – Capt. Early (uncredited)
 Obsession (1949) – Supt. Finsbury
 Double Confession (1950) – Inspector Tenby
 Trio (1950) – Mr. Ramsey (in segment Mr. Know-All)
 Highly Dangerous (1950) – Mr. Hedgerley
 Circle of Danger (1951) – Reggie Sinclair
 The Happy Family (1952) – Mr. Filch
 The Tall Headlines (1952) – Police Inspector
 Treasure Hunt (1952) – Eustace Mills
 The Titfield Thunderbolt (1953) – Blakeworth
 You Know What Sailors Are (1954) – Captain Owbridge
 Operation Bullshine (1959) – Major Pym
 Double Bunk (1961) – 1st Thames Conservancy Officer
 Nothing Barred (1961) – Lord Whitebait

References

External links
 
 

People educated at Clifton College
1901 births
1970 deaths
Welsh male stage actors
Welsh male film actors
20th-century Welsh male actors
British male comedy actors